The Regulatory Reform (Scotland) Act 2014 is an Act of the Scottish Parliament, introduced to the legislature in 2013, and became law after receiving Royal Assent on 19 February 2014. It sought to improve the regulation of businesses requiring certain environmental permits within Scotland whilst strengthening existing protections of the environment.

History
John Swinney MSP introduced the Regulatory Reform (Scotland) Bill to Parliament on 27 March 2013, supported by Paul Wheelhouse MSP and Fergus Ewing MSP. It passed through the various stages in Parliament between November 2013 and January 2014 and received Royal Assent on 19 February 2014, with Part 5 of the Act (excluding section 57) coming into force the following day. The legislation allowed for the remainder of the Act to come into force on a future date at the will of the Scottish Ministers. The Act arose from recommendations made to the Government by the Environmental Crime Task Force.

Regulatory changes
The Act attempts to make it easier for businesses to apply for certain permits and licences in Scotland, while strengthening environmental regulations to protect the country's natural heritage. Businesses will be able to apply for a single permit for a site where several would have been required previously. In addition, it gives courts additional sentencing powers in relation to environmental crime and give the Scottish Environment Protection Agency more powers to enforce laws. A new criminal offence of causing environmental harm has also been created.

See also
 Environmental crime
 Scottish Environment Protection Agency

References

Acts of the Scottish Parliament 2014
Environmental crime
Environmental law
Reform in Scotland